Radio Maria (formally known as The World Family of Radio Maria; , , , , , , , , known in Germany as Radio Horeb) is an international Catholic radio broadcasting service founded in Erba, province of Como, in the diocese of Milan, Italy, in 1987.

The World Family of Radio Maria was formed in 1998, mainly based on the Our Lady of Medjugorje apparitions and messages, and today has branches in 86 countries around the world. Its mission includes liturgy, catechesis, spirituality, devotions, prayer, spiritual assistance with everyday issues, information, music, and culture.

History 
Its first broadcast facility was from a parish in Arcellasco d'Erba (province of Como, Italy), but in 1987 it became a separate entity outside its home parish as an association of lay people and priests as Radio Maria Italia. In less than five years, it grew into a national Catholic radio network throughout Italy. Though not directly connected with the Roman Catholic hierarchy, it was founded as an instrument of the Church and as a tool for evangelization, implementing and adhering to the teachings of the Catholic Church. Initially it was inspired by the appeals made by the Blessed Virgin Mary in Fátima, Portugal, and in more recent years based on the Marian messages from Medjugorje, Bosnia and Herzegovina, pleading for worldwide conversion. As such, Radio Maria is not subsidized or funded by the Roman Catholic Church; instead it is underwritten by listener contributions.

In 1994, the principal founder don M. Galbiati left Radio Maria and founded Radio Mater, also in Arcellasco d'Erba, as a totally separate entity. Since 5 September 1994 transmissions started in Albavilla in the province of Como. The Liturgy of the Hours is diffused in the Roman Rite.  Radio Mater is broadcast via radio in Italy, in Europe via satellite (DVB-S Hot Bird), and worldwide via Internet (WMP).

The World Family of Radio Maria was formed in 1998 out of its subsequent international growth in the 1990s, and pursuant to the 1987 speech by Pope John Paul II in Saint Peter's Square addressing the need for a new evangelization. Emanuele Ferrario (inspired by the Pope's words to form a new evangelization) is the founder and president of Radio Maria, Inc., which has since grown into an association of 40 multilingual broadcast operations in Africa, Asia, Europe, the Middle East, and the Americas. Overall, Radio Maria operates approximately 1,500 radio transmitters worldwide.

Radio Maria USA 

Its United States of America operation is one of the newest to join the World Family, in May 2000, with KJMJ (AM) in Alexandria, Louisiana, being the originating English-language station, together with a network of several FM and AM repeaters in Louisiana, an AM station in Port Arthur, Texas, on 1250 AM (KDEI), and an FM repeater in Anna, Ohio. An AM repeater in Springfield, Ohio, east of Dayton, commenced broadcasting in June 2008 with new FM repeaters in Hollidaysburg, Pennsylvania, coming on the air in June 2009, D'Iberville, Mississippi, and Peshtigo, Wisconsin, both in May 2010. Spanish-language and Italian-language programming is heard on FM subcarrier frequencies in Boston, Chicago, Houston, New York City and Washington, D.C.. Italian-language programming can also be heard on the New York City FM subcarrier as well as French Canadian and English speaking services on FM subcarriers in Toronto, Ontario. Audiostreaming is available from most of these stations.

World Family of Radio Maria

Radio stations in Europe

Radio stations in Asia

Radio stations in Oceania

Radio stations in Africa

Radio stations in the Americas

Programming 

Programming mostly consists of traditional Catholic worship music, but some stations also air a mix of traditional and contemporary Catholic music, along with various talk and teaching programs discussing the Catholic faith, frequent recitals of the Holy Rosary, novenas, and Masses.

Facilities 
Radio Maria's programming mostly emanates from one centrally located studio or station in a given region or country, and is then re-broadcast (or "simulcast") on a network of repeater transmitters on the AM and FM bands. Some employ the use of a subcarrier, also known as SCA (for "Subsidiary Communications Authority") facilities of FM stations, requiring the use of a receiver designed to receive SCA signals. Since the emergence of the internet, audio-streaming has been used extensively as a means to help fill in gaps left by the unavailability of AM or FM frequencies in metropolitan areas already taken up by commercial, public, or other religious broadcasters.

Starting in June 2008, there have been shortwave transmissions originating from Italy at 26 MHz and at 26.01 MHz DRM making it the only (and last) shortwave service originating in Italy besides Vatican Radio. There are presently no commercial satellite radio subscription services (such as Sky Digital, Sirius or XM) of Radio Maria. However, its Spanish-language, Italian-language, and Polish-language stations may be available in some areas served by the Dish Pronto division of Dish Network, a satellite television subscription service.

See also

Blessed Virgin Mary
Christian radio
Contemporary Catholic music
List of religious radio stations
Roman Catholic Church

References

External links

Radio stations established in 1987
International radio networks
Shortwave radio stations
Catholic radio stations
Radio stations in Italy
Radio stations in France
Radio stations in Spain
Radio stations in Belgium
Radio stations in the Netherlands
Radio stations in Switzerland
Radio stations in Austria
Radio stations in Hungary
Radio stations in Croatia
Radio stations in Bosnia and Herzegovina
Radio stations in Serbia
Radio stations in Albania
Radio stations in Malta
Radio stations in Romania
Radio stations in Ukraine
Radio stations in Russia
Radio stations in Lithuania
Radio stations in Lebanon
Radio stations in Indonesia
Radio stations in the Philippines
Radio stations in Burkina Faso
Radio stations in Gabon
Radio stations in Kenya
Radio stations in Malawi
Radio stations in Mozambique
Radio stations in Rwanda
Radio stations in Argentina
Radio stations in Brazil
Radio stations in Ontario
Radio stations in Quebec
Radio stations in Chile
Radio stations in Colombia
Radio stations in the Dominican Republic
Christian radio stations in Mexico
Radio stations in Paraguay
Radio stations in Peru
Radio stations in Portugal
Radio stations in Venezuela
American radio networks
Multilingual broadcasters
Radio stations broadcasting on subcarriers
1987 establishments in Italy
Christian radio stations